Harborough is a constituency covering the south east of Leicestershire represented in the House of Commons of the UK Parliament since 2017 by Neil O'Brien of the Conservative Party.

It is considered a safe seat for the Conservative Party, as there has been a Conservative representative elected since 1924 (with a brief 5 year interlude from the Labour Party in 1945).

Boundaries

1885–1918: The Municipal Borough of Leicester, the Sessional Divisions of Lutterworth and Market Harborough, and parts of the Sessional Divisions of Leicester and East Norton.

1918–1950: The Urban Districts of Market Harborough, Oadby, and Wigston, and the Rural Districts of Blaby, Hallaton, Lutterworth, and Market Harborough.

1950–1955: The Urban Districts of Market Harborough, Oadby, and Wigston, and the Rural Districts of Blaby, Lutterworth, and Market Harborough.

1955–1974: The Urban Districts of Market Harborough and Wigston, and the Rural Districts of Blaby, Lutterworth, and Market Harborough.

1974–1983: The Urban Districts of Market Harborough, Oadby, and Wigston, and the Rural Districts of Billesdon and Market Harborough.

1983–1997: The District of Harborough wards of Billesdon, Bosworth, Easton, Fleckney, Glen, Houghton, Kibworth, Langton, Lubenham, Market Harborough Bowden, Market Harborough North, Market Harborough South, Market Harborough West, Scraptoft, Thurnby, and Tilton, and the Borough of Oadby and Wigston.

1997–2010: The District of Harborough wards of Bosworth, Fleckney, Glen, Kibworth, Langton, Lubenham, Market Harborough Bowden, Market Harborough North, Market Harborough South, and Market Harborough West, and the Borough of Oadby and Wigston wards of All Saints, Bassett, Brocks Hill, Brookside, Central, Fairfield, Grange, St Peter's, St Wolstan's, and Westfield.

2010–present: The District of Harborough wards of Bosworth, Fleckney, Glen, Kibworth, Lubenham, Market Harborough Great Bowden and Arden, Market Harborough Little Bowden, Market Harborough Logan, and Market Harborough Welland, and the Borough of Oadby and Wigston wards of Oadby Brocks Hill, Oadby Grange, Oadby St Peter's, Oadby Uplands, Oadby Woodlands, South Wigston, Wigston All Saints, Wigston Fields, Wigston Meadowcourt, and Wigston St Wolstan's.

The constituency takes its name from Market Harborough, seat of the Harborough local government district. The constituency excludes parts of the Harborough district (including some eastern suburbs of Leicester which are in the Rutland & Melton constituency, but includes the smaller borough of Oadby and Wigston that adjoins Leicester.

Constituency profile

Harborough is one of the wealthier constituencies in the East Midlands. It is a safe seat for the Conservatives, who have held the seat for 70 years.

History
The seat was created in the Redistribution of Seats Act 1885 and in boundary changes in 1974 reflecting the growth in population and electorate of Leicestershire lost a large amount of its territory to the new seat of Blaby.

Members of Parliament

Elections

Elections in the 2010s

UKIP originally selected Clive Langley, who was replaced by Mark Hunt in March 2015.

Elections in the 2000s

Elections in the 1990s

Elections in the 1980s

Elections in the 1970s

Elections in the 1960s

Elections in the 1950s

Elections in the 1940s 

General Election 1939–40:

Another general election was required to take place before the end of 1940, however this did not happen due to the Second World War. The political parties had been making preparations for an election to take place from 1939 and by the end of this year, the following candidates had been selected: 
Conservative: Ronald Tree
Labour: A E Bennett

Elections in the 1930s

Elections in the 1920s

Elections in the 1910s

Election results 1885–1918

Elections in the 1880s

Elections in the 1890s

Elections in the 1900s

Elections in the 1910s

General Election 1914–15:

Another General Election was required to take place before the end of 1915, however this was not held due to the First World War. The political parties had been making preparations for an election to take place and by July 1914, the following candidates had been selected:
Liberal: Percy Harris
Conservative: Unknown

See also
List of parliamentary constituencies in Leicestershire and Rutland

Notes

References

Sources

External links
 Harborough Conservative Association
 
 Edward Garnier QC MP
 Kevin McKeever (Labour Parliamentary Candidate - 2010)

Parliamentary constituencies in Leicestershire
Constituencies of the Parliament of the United Kingdom established in 1885